The Beaverlodge Blades were a Junior "B" Ice Hockey team based in Beaverlodge, Alberta, Canada. They are members of the North West Junior Hockey League (NWJHL) and played their home games at Beaverlodge Arena. Beaverlodge is located west of Grande Prairie, Alberta.

The team folded after the 2018 season, but were accepted back into the North West Junior Hockey League for the 2022-23 season.

Season-by-season record
Note: GP = Games played, W = Wins, L = Losses, OTL = Overtime Losses, Pts = Points, GF = Goals for, GA = Goals against, PIM = Penalties in minutes

References

External links
Official website of the Beaverlodge Blades

Ice hockey teams in Alberta
2000 establishments in Alberta
Ice hockey clubs established in 2000